Culver is a surname that can mean "dove" or "pidgeon". Notable people with the surname include:

Andrew Culver (railroad) (1832–1906), founder of the Prospect Park and Coney Island Railroad
Chet Culver (born 1966), American politician and the former governor of Iowa
Ellsworth Culver (1927–2005), humanitarian/aid worker and co-founder of Mercy Corps International
Frank Culver (1897–1955), college football player and attorney
Frank Culver (NFL) (1897–1969), professional football player
Frank P. Culver (c. 1864–1949), president of Polytechnic College
Frank P. Culver Jr. (1889–1980), justice of the Texas Supreme Court
George Culver (born 1943), American Major League Baseball pitcher
Harry Culver (1880–1946), American real-estate developer, founder of Culver City, California
Henry Harrison Culver (1840–1897), founder of the Culver Military Academy in Culver, Indiana
Jarrett Culver (born 1999), American basketball player
John Culver (1932–2018), American politician who represented Iowa; father of Chet Culver
Michael Culver (born 1938), English actor
Roland Culver (1900–1984), English actor

English-language surnames